Ebrahima Camara (born 18 September 1996) is a Gambian athlete. He competed in the men's 100 metres event at the 2019 World Athletics Championships.

He competed in the men's 100 metres event at the 2020 Summer Olympics.

References

External links
 

1996 births
Living people
Gambian male sprinters
Place of birth missing (living people)
World Athletics Championships athletes for the Gambia
Athletes (track and field) at the 2020 Summer Olympics
Olympic athletes of the Gambia
Athletes (track and field) at the 2018 Commonwealth Games
Athletes (track and field) at the 2019 African Games